Dato' Seri Utama Haji Mohamad bin Hasan (born 2 May 1956), familiarly known as Tok Mat or Mat Hasan, is a Malaysian politician who has served as the Minister of Defence in the Pakatan Harapan (PH) administration under Prime Minister Anwar Ibrahim since December 2022. He has also served as Deputy Chairman of the Barisan Nasional (BN) and Deputy President of the United Malays National Organisation (UMNO) since June 2018, the Member of Parliament (MP) for Rembau since November 2022, State Leader of the Opposition of Negeri Sembilan from July 2018 to February 2019 and again since April 2019 as well as Member of the Negeri Sembilan State Legislative Assembly (MLA) for Rantau from March 2004 to February 2019 and again since April 2019. He served as the 10th Menteri Besar of Negeri Sembilan from March 2004 to the collapse of the BN state administration in May 2018.

Early life and education
Mohamad was born in Kampung Kundur Hilir, Rantau, Seremban, Negeri Sembilan, on 2 May 1956. He received his early education at Sekolah Kebangsaan Datuk Akhir Zaman, Rantau, and continued his secondary education at Sekolah Menengah Kebangsaan Rantau. After completing secondary education, he went to Form 6 at Tuanku Ampuan Durah Secondary School, Seremban, and later pursued his undergraduate degree in International Relations at the University of Malaya (UM) in 1975.

Corporate career
Mohamad started his career with Malayan Banking Berhad as a trainee officer. His last position with Maybank was assistant branch manager at Petaling Jaya main branch before joining Arab Malaysia Merchant Bank. His last position with Arab Malaysian Merchant Bank was Manager at Johor Bahru branch. Mohamad later moved to Bank Bumiputra Malaysia Berhad, and had served as General Manager of Bank Bumiputra London (1988-1992). After dabbling in the banking world, he moved to the corporate sector as Chief Executive Officer of Cold Storage Malaysia Berhad (1992-1994). His last position in the corporate sector was as Managing Director of Cycle and Carriage Bintang Berhad (1994-2004).

In addition, Mohamad was also a member of the Board of Directors of Khazanah Nasional Berhad, as well as Chairman of the FIMA Berhad Group, as well as the Board of Directors of Sepang International Circuit (SIC).

Political career
After winning the Rantau state seat in the Negeri Sembilan State Legislative Assembly in the 2004 election, Mohamad sworn in as Menteri Besar of Negeri Sembilan on 25 March 2004. He managed to retain the seat in the 2008 election, 2013 election and was even unopposed in 2018 election after the Election Commission (EC) returning officer barred People's Justice Party (PKR)’s candidate Dr Streram Sinnansamy from filing his nomination papers. The Election Court has on the 16 November 2018, allowed the petition by Dr S. Streram and ruled that Mohamad's election was null and void. Mohamad had successfully won and defended the seat in a fresh by-election which was held on 13 April 2019.

Mohamad is also the Rembau Umno Division Chief, UMNO Supreme Council Member and UMNO Deputy President. Mohamad was officially appointed as acting President of UMNO when Ahmad Zahid Hamidi was taking an over 6-month garden leave from carrying out his duties as party president from 19 December 2018 to 30 June 2019.

Menteri Besar of Negeri Sembilan
Mohamad's term as Menteri Besar of Negeri Sembilan is mostly perceived as progressive in terms of the state development with his 20 years' experience in the corporate sector being seen as the main contributing factor for his successful tenure. Among the most significant policies made by him was by limiting the state exco year of service to maximum of two years to ensure the appointees will work diligently within the appointment period. As a result, during his term in the office, the state economic growth increased by 5.2% and 6.2% in 2011 and 2012 respectively. He also managed to reduce the state debt to federal government from RM2 billion to RM700 million by cash with a cash reserve of RM500 million as of 2018 election.

Green development and industrial reformation
Mohamad had always ensured to incorporate nature and environmental consideration in the development of the state.

Among the related projects were Malaysia Visionary Valley (MVV), Agropolis and Biodiversiti in the region of Seremban, Port Dickson, Jempol, Tampin, Kuala Pilah and Jelebu. These projects had brought more than the initially expected of RM1-billion new investment into the state in 2015.

He also reformed the state agricultural-based industry into manufacturing to accommodate the growing demand for new manufacturing area due to industrial expansion and congestion in Klang Valley area. The manufacturing regions are located around the downstream area of to ensure no disruption toward the state water supply while the manufacturing companies with green technologies were prioritized by the state.

State Leader of the Opposition
Upon the change of government due to 2018 Malaysian general election, the new Pakatan Harapan (PH) state government applaud Mohamad's administration and planned to match his portfolio. Mohamad becomes the Leader of the Opposition for Negeri Sembilan since 2 July 2018.

Election results
{| class="wikitable" style="margin:0.5em ; font-size:95%"
|+ Negeri Sembilan State Legislative Assembly Results only available from the 2004 election. Percentage figures based on total turnout. 
!|Year
!|Constituency
!colspan=2|Candidate
!|Votes
!|Pct
!colspan=2|Opponent(s)
!|Votes
!|Pct
!|Ballots cast
!|Majority
!|Turnout
|-
|2004
| rowspan="7" |N27 Rantau| rowspan="7"  |
|Mohamad Hasan (UMNO)
| align="right" |8,031| 79.30%|  |
| Badrul Hisham Shaharin (PKR)
| align="right" |1,832
| 18.09% 
|10,127	 
|6,199	 
|72.77%	 
|-
|2008
|Mohamad Hasan (UMNO)
| align="right" |7,739	
|66.17%|  |
| Aisah Lamsah (PKR)
| align="right" |3,956
| 33.83% 
|12,216
|3,783
|80.77%
|-
|2013
|Mohamad Hasan (UMNO)
| align="right" |10,126	
|64.75%|  |
| Aisah Lamsah (PKR)
| align="right" |5,513	
| 35.25% 
|15,878
|4,613
|87.09%
|-
|2018
|Mohamad Hasan (UMNO) 1
|align="right" |None|align="right" |None| colspan="7" bgcolor="dcdcdc"|
|-
| rowspan="3" |2019
| rowspan="3" |Mohamad Hasan (UMNO)
| rowspan="3" |10,379| rowspan="3" |63.18%| |
|
|5,887
|35.84%
| rowspan="3" |16,428
| rowspan="3" |4,510
| rowspan="3" |79.30%
|-
| |
|Malar Rajaram (IND)
|align="right" |83
|align="right" |0.50%
|-
| |
|Mohd Nor Yassin (IND)
|align="right" |79
|align="right" |0.48%
|}
Note: 1  The Election Court has on the 16 September 2018, passed a ruling that Mohamad Hasan had not been duly elected and a fresh by-election was called to be held after Mohamad Hasan's appeal was dismissed by the Federal Court on 18 February 2019.

Honours
Honours of Malaysia
  :
  Commander of the Order of Loyalty to the Royal Family of Malaysia (PSD) – Datuk (1999)
  :
  Knight Companion of the Order of Loyalty to Negeri Sembilan (DSNS) – Dato' (2003)
  Knight Grand Commander of the Order of Loyalty to Negeri Sembilan (SPNS) – Dato' Seri Utama (2004)
  :
  Knight Companion of the Order of Sultan Salahuddin Abdul Aziz Shah (DSSA) – Dato'''' (1999)

See also
 Rantau (state constituency)
 2019 Rantau by-election

References

1956 births
Living people
People from Negeri Sembilan
Malaysian people of Malay descent
Malaysian Muslims
United Malays National Organisation politicians
Leaders of the Opposition in the Negeri Sembilan State Legislative Assembly
Chief Ministers of Negeri Sembilan
Negeri Sembilan state executive councillors
Members of the Negeri Sembilan State Legislative Assembly
University of Malaya alumni
21st-century Malaysian politicians
Commanders of the Order of Loyalty to the Royal Family of Malaysia